John W. O'Rourke (August 23, 1849 – June 23, 1911) was a 19th-century baseball player. Between 1879 and 1883, he played in the National League with the Boston Red Caps (1879–1880) and in the American Association for the New York Metropolitans (1883). A center fielder, O'Rourke batted and threw left-handed. He was born in Bridgeport, Connecticut.  O'Rourke was the older brother of Jim O'Rourke, another major league baseball player.
 
In a three-season career, O'Rourke posted a .295 batting average with 11 home runs and 98 RBI in 230 games.

O'Rourke died in Boston, Massachusetts, at age 61.

Best season
1879 – Led National League in slugging percentage (.521) and RBI (62), and finished fourth in the batting race with a .341 BA behind Paul Hines (.357), his younger brother Jim O'Rourke (.348), and King Kelly (.348).

See also
 List of Major League Baseball annual runs batted in leaders

Sources
Baseball Almanac
Baseball Library

1849 births
1911 deaths
Boston Red Caps players
New York Metropolitans players
National League RBI champions
Major League Baseball center fielders
Sportspeople from Bridgeport, Connecticut
Baseball players from Connecticut
Manchester (minor league baseball) players
Philadelphia Athletics (minor league) players
19th-century baseball players